Kulung may refer to:

 Kulung people, an ethnic group of Nepal
 Kulung language (Nepal), a Sino-Tibetan language of Nepal
 Kulung language (Chad), a Chadic language of Chad
 Kulung language (West Chadic), a Chadic language of Nigeria
 Kulung language (Jarawan), a Bantoid language of Nigeria

See also 
 Kolong (disambiguation)

Language and nationality disambiguation pages